A list of films produced in Hong Kong in 1968:.

1968

References

External links
 IMDB list of Hong Kong films
 Hong Kong films of 1968 at HKcinemamagic.com

1968
Hong Kong
Films